Happy Vestköping (Swedish: Lyckliga Vestköping) is a 1937 Swedish comedy film directed by Ragnar Arvedson and starring Isa Quensel, Einar Axelsson and Nils Wahlbom.

Synopsis
The small Swedish town of Vestköping awaits the arrival of Justus Napoleon Rosén, who emigrated to the United States many years before and has reportedly become very wealthy.

Cast
 Isa Quensel as 	Ann-Marie Brandt
 Einar Axelsson as Lennart Rosén
 Nils Wahlbom as 	Uncle Justus Napoleon Rosén
 Tollie Zellman as 	Vivi Rosén
 Olav Riégo as 	Theodor Rosén
 John W. Brunius as Skotte, banker
 Eric Abrahamsson as Edvard Claesson
 Charley Paterson as 	Mayor
 Georg Funkquist as 	Hotel manager
 Stig Järrel as 	Author Rolf Gånge
 Olof Sandborg as Department manager
 Sigge Fürst as 	Worker at the railway station
 Ragnar Arvedson as Secretary
 Gillis Blom as 	Torphammar 
 Rolf Botvid as 	Bank clerk 
 Bertil Ehrenmark as Unemployed 
 Georg Fernqvist as 	Mayor's secretary 
 Millan Fjellström as 	Woman reading a news article 
 Wictor Hagman as 	Janitor at City Hall 
 Nils Hallberg as 	Bell boy 
 Sten Hedlund as 	Secretary 
 Gösta Hillberg as 	Office manager 
 Per Hugo Jacobsson as 	Unemployed 
 Håkan Jahnberg as 	Anne-Marie's secretary 
 Nils Johannisson as 	Hotel clerk 
 Erik Johansson as 	Worker 
 Magnus Kesster as 	Westman 
 Sven Kihlberg as 	American in telephone 
 John Lindén as Young man asking for Justus Rosén 
 Ingrid Luterkort as 	Rosén's maid 
 Gösta Lycke as Thrane 
 Holger Löwenadler as 	Krohn 
 Otto Malmberg as Cashier 
 Arthur Natorp as 	Bank clerk 
 Siri Olson as 	Woman in the waiting room 
 Edla Rothgardt as 	Woman reading a news article 
 Robert Ryberg as Fire captain 
 Harald Svensson as 	Man in the waiting room 
 Eric von Gegerfelt as 	Bank customer 
 Oscar Åberg as 	Guest in Rådhussalen

References

Bibliography 
 Wallengren, Ann-Kristin.  Welcome Home Mr Swanson: Swedish Emigrants and Swedishness on Film. Nordic Academic Press, 2014.

External links 
 

1937 films
1937 comedy films
Swedish comedy films
1930s Swedish-language films
Swedish black-and-white films
Films directed by Ragnar Arvedson
1930s Swedish films